Globalization is a process that encompasses the causes, courses, and consequences of transnational and transcultural integration of human and non-human activities. India had the distinction of being the world's largest economy till the end of the Mughal era, as it accounted for about 32.9% share of world GDP and about 17% of the world population. The goods produced in India had long been exported to far off destinations across the world; the concept of globalization is hardly new to India.

India currently accounts for 2.7% of world trade (as of 2015), up from 1.2% in 2006 according to the World Trade Organization (WTO). Until the liberalisation of 1991, India was largely and intentionally isolated from the world markets, to protect its fledgeling economy and to achieve self-reliance. Foreign trade was subject to import tariffs, export taxes and quantitative restrictions, while foreign direct investment was restricted by upper-limit equity participation, restrictions on technology transfer, export obligations and government approvals; these approvals were needed for nearly 60% of new FDI in the industrial sector. The restrictions ensured that FDI averaged only around $200M annually between 1985 and 1991; a large percentage of the capital flows consisted of foreign aid, commercial borrowing and deposits of non-resident Indians.

India's exports were stagnant for the first 15 years after independence, due to the predominance of tea, jute and cotton manufactures, demand for which was generally inelastic. Imports in the same period consisted predominantly of machinery, equipment and raw materials, due to nascent industrialisation. Since liberalisation, the value of India's international trade has become more broad-based and has risen to  63,0801 billion in 2003–04 from  12.50 billion in 1950–51. India's trading partners are China, the US, the UAE, the UK, Japan and the EU. The exports during April 2007 were $12.31 billion up by 16% and import were $17.68 billion with an increase of 18.06% over the previous year.

India is a founding-member of General Agreement on Tariffs and Trade (GATT) since 1947 and its successor, the World Trade Organization. While participating actively in its general council meetings, India has been crucial in voicing the concerns of the developing world. For instance, India has continued its opposition to the inclusion of such matters as labour and environment issues and other non-tariff barriers into the WTO policies.

Despite reducing import restrictions several times in the 2000s, India was evaluated by the World Trade Organization in 2008 as more restrictive than similar developing economies, such as Brazil, China, and Russia.  The WTO also identified electricity shortages and inadequate transportation infrastructure as significant constraints on trade.
Its restrictiveness has been cited as a factor which isolated it from the global financial crisis of 2008–2009 more than other countries, even though it experienced reduced ongoing economic growth.

Payments
Since independence, India's balance of payments on its current account has been negative. Since liberalisation in the 1990s (precipitated by a balance of payment crisis), India's exports have been consistently rising, covering 80.3% of its imports in 2002–03, up from 66.2% in 1990–91. Although India is still a net importer, since 1996–97, its overall balance of payments (i.e., including the capital account balance), has been positive, largely on account of increased foreign direct investment and deposits from non-resident Indians; until this time, the overall balance was only occasionally positive on account of external assistance and commercial borrowings. As a result, India's foreign currency reserves stood at $285 billion in 2008, which could be used in infrastructural development of the country if used effectively. In September 2017 India's foreign exchange reserves crossed $400 billion.

India's reliance on external assistance and commercial borrowings has decreased since 1991–92, and since 2002–03, it has gradually been repaying these debts. Declining interest rates and reduced borrowings decreased India's debt service ratio to 4.5% in 2007.

In India, external commercial borrowings (ECBs) are being permitted by the government for providing an additional source of funds to Indian corporates. The Ministry of Finance monitors and regulates these borrowings (ECBs) through ECB policy guidelines.

Economy
India's economy has grown drastically since it integrated into the global economy in 1991. It has a drastic impact on India's economical condition. Its average annual rate has grown from 3.5% (1980
–1990) to 7.7% (2002–2012). That rate peaked at 9.5% from 2005 to 2008. Economic growth has also led to increases in the per capita gross domestic product (GDP), from $1,255 in 1978 to $3,452 in 2005, and finally to $8,358 in 2022.

Jobs in the technology and business sectors have many benefits. However, only the people in those sectors are benefiting. The overall employment rate for the country has decreased, while the number of job seekers is increasing at a yearly rate of 2.5%. Despite these statistics, the GDP is increasing every year. Growth is limited to some states, including Gujarat, Maharashtra, Karnataka, Andhra Pradesh, and Tamil Nadu. Other states like Bihar, Uttar Pradesh (UP), Odisha, Madhya Pradesh (MP), Assam, and West Bengal remain poverty-stricken.

Investment

Foreign direct investment (FDI) in India has reached 2% of GDP, compared with 0.1% in 1990, and Indian investment in other countries rose sharply in 2006.

As the third-largest economy in the world in PPP terms, India is a preferred destination for FDI; India has strengths in information technology and other significant areas such as auto components, chemicals, apparels, pharmaceuticals, and jewellery. Despite a surge in foreign investments, rigid FDI policies resulted in a significant hindrance. However, due to some positive economic reforms aimed at deregulating the economy and stimulating foreign investment, India has positioned itself as one of the front-runners of the rapidly growing Asia-Pacific region. India has a large pool of skilled managerial and technical expertise. The size of the middle-class population stands at 50 million and represents a growing consumer market.

India's liberalised FDI policy as of 2005 allowed up to a 100% FDI stake in ventures. Industrial policy reforms have substantially reduced industrial licensing requirements, removed restrictions on expansion and facilitated easy access to foreign technology and FDI. The upward moving growth curve of the real-estate sector owes some credit to a booming economy and liberalised FDI regime. In March 2005, the government amended the rules to allow 100 per cent FDI in the construction business. This automatic route has been permitted in townships, housing, built-up infrastructure and construction development projects including housing, commercial premises, hotels, resorts, hospitals, educational institutions, recreational facilities, and city- and regional-level infrastructure.

Several changes were approved on the FDI policy to remove the caps in most sectors. Fields which require relaxation in FDI restrictions include civil aviation, construction development, industrial parks, petroleum and natural gas, commodity exchanges, credit-information services and mining. But this still leaves an unfinished agenda of permitting greater foreign investment in politically sensitive areas such as insurance and retailing. FDI inflows into India reached a record US$19.5bn in fiscal year 2006/07 (April–March), according to the government's Secretariat for Industrial Assistance. This was more than double the total of US$7.8bn in the previous fiscal year. The FDI inflow for 2007-08 has been reported as $24bn and for 2008–09, it is expected to be above $35 billion. A critical factor in determining India's continued economic growth and realising the potential to be an economic superpower is going to depend on how the government can create incentives for FDI flow across a large number of sectors in India.
In September 2012 the government approved 51% FDI in multi-brand retails despite a lot of pressure from coalition parties. In 2019, the government allowed 100% FDI in Coal mining.

Remittances

Remittances to India are money transfers from Indian workers employed outside the country to friends or relatives in India. Since 1991, India has experienced sharp remittance growth, and it is now the world's leading receiver of remittances. In, 1991 Indian remittances totaled 2.1 billion USD; in 2006, they were estimated at between $22 billion and $25.7 billion, about 3% of India's GDP. India claimed more than 12% of the world's remittances in 2007. In 2017 remittances stood at about US$69 billion.

Culture

IT industry
The integration of technology in India has transformed jobs which required specialized skills and lacked decision-making skills to extensively-defined jobs with higher accountability that require new skills, such as numerical, analytical, communication and interactive skills. As a result of this, more job opportunities are created for people. Technology has also influenced many firms to give their workers more freedom in the workplace. For instance, workers who perform non-routine tasks benefit more than workers who do not.

One event that helped India immensely was when Netscape went public on 9 August 1995. Netscape provided globalization through technology in three major ways. First, Netscape made it possible for the browser to display images from websites. Second, the investment of billions in fibre-optic telecommunications influenced by the dot-com boom and the dot com bubble poured a great deal of hard currency into the Indian economy . Last, the over-investment in technology made it cheaper by creating a global fibre network, which made it easier and faster to transmit data (5).

As a result of the Netscape IPO, more job opportunities were created for Indians, including ones outsourced from other countries. One of the milestones in job opportunities was when thousands of Indian engineers were hired to fix the Y2K bug. The job could have been given to many other companies, but it was outsourced to India. India was now seen in a different light, as being ready to join the workforce as well as able to compete against first-world countries for jobs.

Agriculture
Although India has had immense economic growth, not all sectors of the country have benefited. The funds that should have been directed to the agriculture sector were directed to private-sector enterprises. For instance, growth in the agricultural sector dropped from 3.8% in 2007 to 2.6% in 2008. This decline in growth has greatly affected farmers because production costs are very high, while commodity costs are low. This has resulted in over 150,000 peasant suicides since 1997.

Another way globalization has affected the agricultural sector is through biofuel and medicinal cultivation. There is a food security crisis in India because a significant portion of the land has been designated to grow crops for biofuel. Crops like rice and wheat are often harvested in large quantities. However, the amount of crops that are used for biofuel is largely unregulated, with an inadequate amount going to the poor and needy.

Women
Technology has also increased access to education in India, especially to women. This has decreased the gap between men and women which was created by stratified gender roles. It has also empowered women in two ways. Technology has influenced more women to pursue advanced degrees in computer science and engineering instead of their traditional degrees in social sciences and the humanities. This has resulted in an increase in the number of women in competitive professions.
Globalization expanded the need for higher education for both men and women. This, in turn, has had a tremendous impact on the life of the single woman in India.

The stigmatization and expectations of single women have decreased. For example, it is easier for single women to find living accommodations in cities like Kolkata. Society then puts less pressure on women to marry at a certain age because higher education is now more acceptable. India is promoting higher education for youth as well. New universities are being built, and advertisements on billboards have gone up around Kolkata to attract the growing population of high school graduates.

Education
India has also promoted higher education through the propagation of universities. While 6.1 million children were out of school as of 2014, this was still a significant improvement from 13.46 million in 2006.

The Indian government has invested a lot in promoting higher education in the country, but more progress could be made with the help of private interests. The private sector has more than enough financial power to increase the literacy rate and access to higher education. It can be done through private universities and learning centres. Also, global universities might be established in India to a global perspective can be fixed into the curriculum. Four aspects of global education that universities in India might focus on are a global curriculum, global faculty, global degrees, and global interaction. These aspects would not only help promote higher education but would help prepare India for the growing global competition that globalization is creating.

Health
Another sector the government has neglected is public health. India has one of the lowest ratios of the public to private health expenditure. The infant mortality rate for the richest 20% of the population is only 38 per 1000 live births, while the rate for the poorest 20% is 97 per 1000. Also, the rate of epidemics among the poor is increasing; it is common for outbreaks of contagious diseases like human immunodeficiency virus/acquired immunodeficiency syndrome (HIV/AIDS) and malaria to occur.

Historical context
Thomas Friedman, an American journalist, columnist, and author of "The World Is Flat" separates globalization into three stages; globalization 1.0, 2.0 and 3.0. According to Friedman, globalization 1.0, which dates to 1492, involved countries globalizing for natural resources. In globalization 2.0 (1800–2000), companies globalized for labour and markets. In 3.0, the current stage, companies are seeking to globalize down to small groups of people, or even individuals.

Friedman first described the world's economy as being macroscopic. He explains that only countries interacted with each other, not individuals or small groups. Friedman then focused on how this has changed and improved within globalization 3.0. Under globalization 3.0, the world turned flat and individuals now had the opportunity to work and collaborate with other individuals from varying and diverse backgrounds. Also, Friedman discussed how countries like India are using globalization to their advantage. The economies of countries similar to India are now blooming as the world is flattening and shrinking due to globalization.

Fifty years ago, countries such as India did not have a say in the global market and trade. America and other European powers who were once top players in the international market are now getting competition from countries like India, which is experiencing tremendous economic growth. Technology has played a major role in the advancement of globalization within India.

References

Madhu Kishwar, Deepening Democracy: Challenges of Governance and Globalization in India (Oxford University Press, 2006). .

Economy of India
India